The Pavonia Ferry was a ferry service on the Hudson River which conveyed passengers between New York City and Jersey City. It was launched in 1854. It was sold to the Pavonia Ferry Company of Jersey City for what was considered a low price of $9,050, at New York City Hall, in February 1854.

The ferry takes its name for Pavonia, the first European settlement on the west bank of the Hudson first established in 1633 as part of New Netherland and later expanded to region known as Bergen.

In February 1859 Nathaniel Marsh of the Erie Railroad Company purchased the lease on behalf of the Pavonia Ferry Company. He started a ferry which ran from Chambers Street (Manhattan) to the foot of Pavonia Avenue on the other side of the Hudson Waterfront. Legal problems had prevented the Pavonia Ferry Company from establishing a ferry along this route. The New York and Erie Railroad paid an annual rent of $9,050 to transport passengers back and forth. Eventually the railroad constructed its Pavonia Terminal on the landfilled Harsimus Cove. Suburban and long distance travellers would transfer from trains to boats for the passage across the river. Service to 23rd Street began in 1869.

A January 18, 1903 letter from a Passaic, New Jersey reader to The New York Times, commented about the inadequacy of the boats of the Pavonia Ferry, which was then the property of the Erie Railroad. "All their boats are old, small and entirely inadequate to accommodate the crowds during rush hours." The vessels
then in use by the Erie Railroad, listed with first year of service,  were: Pavonia (1861), Susquehanna (1865), Delaware (1868), Chatauqua
(1868), Passaic (1869), Ridgewood (1873), Paterson (1886), and J.G. McCullough (1891).

See also
Timeline of Jersey City area railroads
Houston, West Street and Pavonia Ferry Railroad
List of ferries across the Hudson River in New York City

References

External links
Breakwater and Pavonia collision
photos of Hudson River ferries and terminals

1854 establishments in New Jersey
Companies based in New Jersey
Transport companies established in 1854
Ferries of New Jersey
Ferries of New York City
Ferry companies of New Jersey
Ferry companies of New York City
Water transportation in New York City
Transportation in Hudson County, New Jersey